Bear Brook is a  stream located in central New Hampshire in the United States.  It is a tributary of the Suncook River, part of the Merrimack River (and therefore Gulf of Maine) watershed. Its entire course is within Bear Brook State Park.

Bear Brook begins at the outlet of Hall Mountain Marsh near the four-corner intersection of the towns of Allenstown, Deerfield, Candia, and Hooksett.  The brook descends to the north, through Deerfield, then turns west and reenters Allenstown.  Nearing Deerfield Road, the brook is impounded by Catamount Pond, with a state park beach and picnic area.  The brook flows northwest from the pond and reaches the Suncook River in less than a mile.

See also

List of rivers of New Hampshire

References

Tributaries of the Merrimack River
Rivers of New Hampshire
Rivers of Merrimack County, New Hampshire